François Person (23 May 1922 – 24 March 1980) was a French racing cyclist. He rode in the 1948 and 1949 Tour de France.

References

External links

1922 births
1980 deaths
French male cyclists